Emirates Global Aluminium ("EGA") is owned equally by Mubadala Investment Company of Abu Dhabi and Investment Corporation of Dubai. EGA is an aluminium conglomerate with interests in bauxite/alumina and primary aluminium smelting.

History

In 1975, Dubai Aluminum (DUBAL) was founded as the UAE's first aluminium production company. The company's first working site was at Jebel Ali, it took four years for the production to start. In 2007, Emirates Aluminium (EMAL) was founded. In 2013, DUBAL and EMAL were merged to form Emirates Global Aluminium (EGA). They use the waste heat of gas and oil fired electricity production for the desalination of sea water.

Core smelter assets

EGA's core operating assets are Dubai Aluminium (“DUBAL”) and Emirates Aluminium (“EMAL”) – whose combined production is 2.34 million tonnes per annum ("tpa"). DUBAL's Jebel Ali operation – comprising a 1 million tpa smelter, a 2,350 MW power station and other facilities – is one of the world's largest single-site primary aluminium smelters. EMAL's Al Taweelah operation – comprising a 1.3 million tpa smelter, a 3,100 MW power station and other facilities – is the world's largest single-site primary aluminium producer.

GAC
EGA is a member of the Gulf Aluminum Council ("GAC"), which represents, promotes and protects the interests of the aluminium industries within the Persian Gulf region.

References

External links

Aluminium smelters
Aluminium companies of the United Arab Emirates
Manufacturing companies based in Abu Dhabi